Godfrey Onyeka (born May 23, 1994) is a professional Canadian football defensive back for the Saskatchewan Roughriders of the Canadian Football League (CFL).

University career 
Onyeka played U Sports football for the Wilfrid Laurier Golden Hawks from 2014 to 2017. He was a member of the Golden Hawks 2016 Yates Cup championship team and was a three-time U Sports First Team All-Canadian after winning the award in 2015, 2016, and 2017.

Professional career

Edmonton Eskimos 
In the CFL Scouting Bureau's Final Rankings, Onyeka was named the 10th best player available in the 2018 CFL Draft. In alignment with his ranking, he was selected with the 10th overall pick in the draft by the Edmonton Eskimos and signed with the team on May 16, 2018. He made the team's roster following training camp and played in the team's season opening game on June 14, 2018, against the Winnipeg Blue Bombers. In his rookie year, he played in nine games where he made two defensive tackles.

In 2019, Onyeka played in all 18 regular season games where he recorded three defensive tackles and 13 special teams tackles. He also played in his first two post-season games, against the Montreal Alouettes in the Semi-Final and then the Hamilton Tiger-Cats in the Division Final, where he posted three defensive tackles and one special teams tackle over the two games. He did not play in 2020 due to the cancellation of the 2020 CFL season and he became a free agent on February 9, 2021.

Saskatchewan Roughriders 
On the first day of free agency, on February 9, 2021, Onyeka signed with the Saskatchewan Roughriders. He made a career-high eight defensive tackles against the Winnipeg Blue Bombers on September 11, 2021, in the Banjo Bowl.

Personal life 
Onyeka was born in Lagos, Nigeria to parents Jane and Godfrey Onyeka Sr. He moved with his family to Canada when he was 11 years old and grew up in Brampton, Ontario. His younger brother, Kene Onyeka, plays professionally in the CFL as a defensive lineman. His cousin, Nakas Onyeka, plays linebacker and was drafted by the Toronto Argonauts, and his other cousin, Kosi Onyeka, plays linebacker for the Guelph Gryphons.

References

External links 
Roughriders bio

1994 births
Living people
Canadian football defensive backs
Edmonton Elks players
Nigerian players of Canadian football
Players of Canadian football from Ontario
Saskatchewan Roughriders players
Sportspeople from Brampton
Wilfrid Laurier Golden Hawks football players